Sebastian Wännström (born March 3, 1991) is a Swedish ice hockey player, currently playing with Augsburger Panther of the Deutsche Eishockey Liga (DEL).

Playing career
Wännström made his professional debut with his original club, Brynäs IF of the Swedish Hockey League. He was drafted in the second round, 44th overall by the St. Louis Blues of the NHL in the 2010 NHL Entry Draft.

Wännström's first Elitserien goal was a game winning penalty shot on October 20, 2011 against Johan Gustafsson of Luleå HF.

After completing the final year of his entry-level contract with the St. Louis Blues, failing to establish himself in American Hockey League with Blues affiliate, the Chicago Wolves, Wännström returned to his native Sweden in signing a two-year contract with Rögle BK of the SHL on May 19, 2015.

Wännström left the club as a free agent following the 2016–17 season, agreeing to a two-year contract with current champions, HV71, on May 10, 2017.

At the conclusion of the 2018–19 season, having fulfilled his contract with HV71, Wännström left to sign a two-year SHL contract with the newly promoted Leksands IF on April 11, 2019.

In the 2020–21 he played with Ässät of the Finnish Liiga and was noted as the player of the month in February 2021. He also was the league leading goal scorer for season with 33 goals through 58 regular season games.

On 23 April 2021, Wännström signed his first contract in the KHL, agreeing to a one-year deal with Latvian based club, Dinamo Riga.

Career statistics

Regular season and playoffs

International

References

External links

1991 births
Living people
HC Ajoie players
Ässät players
Augsburger Panther players
Brynäs IF players
Chicago Wolves players
Dinamo Riga players
Evansville IceMen players
HV71 players
Kalamazoo Wings (ECHL) players
Leksands IF players
Peoria Rivermen (AHL) players
Swedish ice hockey right wingers
St. Louis Blues draft picks
People from Gävle
Sportspeople from Gävleborg County